Königsborn station is a railway station in the municipality of Königsborn, located in the Jerichower Land district in Saxony-Anhalt, Germany.

References

Railway stations in Saxony-Anhalt
Buildings and structures in Jerichower Land